Mauvilla is an unincorporated community in Mobile County, Alabama, United States. A post office operated under the name Mauvilla in 1856 and from 1895 to 1912.

Geography

References

Unincorporated communities in Alabama
Unincorporated communities in Mobile County, Alabama
Alabama placenames of Native American origin